Manping (Mandarin: 满坪镇) is a town in Minhe Hui and Tu Autonomous County, Haidong, Qinghai, China. In 2010, Manping had a total population of 14,362: 7,621 males and 6,741 females: 3,510 aged under 14, 9,934 aged between 15 and 65 and 918 aged over 65.

References 
 

Township-level divisions of Qinghai
Haidong